Chad Folk (born October 28, 1972) is a former professional Canadian Football League centre for the Toronto Argonauts. He was the first overall pick in the 1997 CFL Draft.

Junior college years
Folk attended Butte College in Oroville, California, and was a two-time team captain and a two-time All-American.

College career
Folk attended the University of Utah and was an elementary education major and a football star. In football, he was a two-time Academic All-American selection and as a senior, he was also named the Team MVP.

References

External links
 Toronto Argonauts profile

1972 births
Living people
Canadian football offensive linemen
Canadian players of American football
Toronto Argonauts players
Utah Utes football players
Butte College alumni
Sportspeople from Kelowna
Players of Canadian football from British Columbia